Saint-Martin-de-Clelles (literally Saint-Martin of Clelles) is a commune in the Isère department (Auvergne Rhône-Alpes) in  southeastern France.

Population

See also
Communes of the Isère department
Parc naturel régional du Vercors

References

Communes of Isère
Isère communes articles needing translation from French Wikipedia